USS R. B. Forbes was a steamer acquired by the Union Navy during the American Civil War. Originally built in either 1845 or 1846, the vessel saw service as a tugboat and briefly a lightship at Boston, Massachusetts.  Built by Otis Tufts and named after Robert Bennet Forbes, she was the first iron mercantile vessel built in New England.

Purchased by the Union Navy in 1861 for $52,500, she was converted to a warship and saw action during the Battle of Port Royal on November 7.  On February 25, 1862, en route to join the Mortar Flotilla, she was wrecked on the Currituck Banks in a storm and was burned to prevent capture.

Construction and characteristics
R. B. Forbes was constructed in 1845 or 1846 at Boston, Massachusetts. The engines were fed by two boilers. Her hull was made of iron. She was built by shipbuilder and inventor Otis Tufts and named after Robert Bennet Forbes, a captain and ship owner who helped originate the concept of the ship. R. B. Forbes was the first iron mercantile vessel built in New England.

Service career
R. B. Forbes was in service by early January 1846. She was used as a towboat in Boston Harbor, bringing clipper ships into the open ocean.  In 1847, when USS Jamestown began her journey to Ireland to provide relief related to the Great Famine, the organizers of the relief mission watched from aboard R. B. Forbes.  In September 1850, she suffered about $100 of damage in a fire. R. B. Forbes also briefly saw service as a lightship: from April 18 to May 22, 1851, she was stationed at Minots Ledge while the regularly assigned lightship was en route.  She towed the clipper Great Republic from Boston to New York City in 1853.  Seven years later, the vessel towed the schooner Spring Hill (later known as United States) to Nantasket Roads in preparation for Isaac Israel Hayes's Arctic expedition.  In 1860, the Wilmington Daily Herald described her as "as sound now as when first built" and compared her favorably to the similar, but wooden, vessel Enoch Train.  R. B. Forbes was not financially successful, and went through several owners.

In 1861, the Union Navy purchased the ship for use in the American Civil War, at a cost of $52,500.  The acquisition began on August 17, but was not formalized until September 20.  The vessel was commissioned in August.  After being outfitted in Boston, R. B. Forbes left on August 25 under the command of Acting Master William G. Gregory for the Washington Navy Yard, where she spent most of September.  The Navy armed her with two 32-pounder cannons and a rifled 30-pounder gun.  She was manned by a crew of 51.  R. B. Forbes was first assigned to service in the Chesapeake Bay area, but then was ordered to join the South Atlantic Blockading Squadron.  Having left to join the blockading squadron in late October, she arrived in time to fight in the Battle of Port Royal on November 7; the battle ended with Union forces capturing Fort Walker and Fort Beauregard from the Confederates.  Under the command of Lieutenant Henry S. Newcomb, the vessel fired 43 artillery rounds at a Confederate artillery battery on land.  Newcomb reported that some of the shells fired had issues with jamming in the cannons' barrels.

After remaining in the Port Royal area until December, she was towed to New York by the steamboat Atlantic, as she had suffered damage to her port shaft and propeller. After arriving on December 20, she was decommissioned for repairs. After being recommissioned on February 8, 1862, R. B. Forbes was ordered to journey to join the Mortar Flotilla, a collection of ships armed with mortars designed to bombard fortifications into submission, near New Orleans, Louisiana. During the way, she was caught in a storm on February 25, off of Nags Head, North Carolina, and driven onto the Currituck Banks. Her propellers were broken during the wreck, and as it was deemed impossible to get her dislodged, she was burned to prevent capture.

See also

List of United States Navy ships

References

Sources
 
 
 
 

 
 
 
 
 
 
 
 

Ships of the Union Navy
Steamships of the United States Navy
Gunboats of the United States Navy
American Civil War patrol vessels of the United States
Shipwrecks of the Carolina coast
Shipwrecks of the American Civil War
Maritime incidents in February 1862
Ship fires
1845 ships